Angel Kalburov (13 March 1955 – 8 May 2014) was a Bulgarian footballer who played as a defender.

Honours

Club
CSKA Sofia
 Bulgarian League (3): 1979–80, 1980–81, 1981–82

References

External links
Player Profile at fccska.com

1955 births
2014 deaths
Bulgarian footballers
Bulgaria international footballers
Association football defenders
FC Dimitrovgrad players
Botev Plovdiv players
PFC CSKA Sofia players
OFC Sliven 2000 players
Akademik Sofia players
First Professional Football League (Bulgaria) players
Bulgarian football managers
People from Dimitrovgrad, Bulgaria
Sportspeople from Haskovo Province